Popular Motoring was a British car magazine founded in April 1962 by Mercury House. It covered a broad spectrum of motoring topics, including buyer's guides and DIY maintenance advice. During the 1970s it was retitled Popular Motoring & Practical Car Maintenance, later reverting to its original title. The magazine was taken over by EMAP and eventually merged with Practical Motorist in 1982.

References

Automobile magazines published in the United Kingdom
Defunct magazines published in the United Kingdom
Magazines established in 1962
Magazines disestablished in 1982